Esther Liebmann (née Schulhoff; 1649 – 15 April 1714) was a German financier. In Berlin, she served as court Jew to King Friedrich I of Prussia, inheriting the title and also the Münzregal from her second husband, Jost Liebmann. She served as court jeweler, assisting the king in obtaining a large collection of gems and jewelry. When her husband was living, the couple worked together and were some of the most well-to-do Jews in Berlin. After Liebmann's husband's death in 1701, she carried on their business and became responsible for minting official coinage for the crown. In her lifetime, she was known as the most powerful woman in the country.

References 

1649 births
1714 deaths
17th-century German Jews
17th-century German businesswomen
17th-century German businesspeople
18th-century German businesswomen
18th-century German businesspeople
Women bankers
Court Jews
Jewish women in business